Objection  may refer to:
 Objection (United States law), a motion during a trial to disallow a witness's testimony or other evidence
 Objection (argument), used in informal logic and argument mapping
 Inference objection, a special case of the above
 Counterargument, in informal logic, an objection to an objection
 Objection to the consideration of a question, in parliamentary procedure
 Objection (Tango), a song by Shakira
 A phrase shouted numerous times in games from the Ace Attorney series; its purpose in line with the legal and argumental terms

See also
 Object (disambiguation)